Delevoryas is a surname. Notable people with the surname include:

Lillian Delevoryas (1932–2018), American artist
Theodore Delevoryas (1929–2017), American paleobotanist